The Olive Branch Petition was adopted by the Second Continental Congress on July 5, 1775, and signed on July 8 in a final attempt to avoid war between Great Britain and the Thirteen Colonies in America. The Congress had already authorized the invasion of Canada more than a week earlier, but the petition affirmed American loyalty to Great Britain and entreated King George III to prevent further conflict. It was followed by the July 6 Declaration of the Causes and Necessity of Taking Up Arms, however, which made its success unlikely in London.  In August 1775, the colonies were formally declared to be in rebellion by the Proclamation of Rebellion, and the petition was rejected by the British government; King George had refused to read it before declaring the colonists traitors.

Drafting

The Second  Continental Congress convened in May 1775, and most delegates followed John Dickinson in his quest to reconcile with King George. However, a rather small group of delegates led by John Adams believed that war was inevitable, and they decided that the wisest course of action was to remain quiet and wait for the opportune time to rally the people. This allowed Dickinson and his followers to pursue their own course for reconciliation.

Dickinson was the primary author of the petition, though Benjamin Franklin, John Jay, John Rutledge, and Thomas Johnson also served on the drafting committee.  Dickinson claimed that the colonies did not want independence but wanted more equitable trade and tax regulations.  He asked that the King establish a lasting settlement between the Mother Country and the colonies "upon so firm a basis as to perpetuate its blessings, uninterrupted by any future dissensions, to succeeding generations in both countries", beginning with the repeal of the Intolerable Acts. The introductory paragraph of the letter named twelve of the thirteen colonies, all except Georgia. The letter was approved on July 5 and signed by John Hancock, President of the Second Congress, and by representatives of the named twelve colonies. It was sent to London on July 8, 1775, in the care of Richard Penn and Arthur Lee. Dickinson hoped that news of the Battles of Lexington and Concord combined with the "humble petition" would persuade the King to respond with a counter-proposal or open negotiations.

Reception and rejection
Adams wrote to a friend that the petition served no purpose, that war was inevitable, and that the colonies should have already raised a navy and taken British officials prisoner. The letter was intercepted by British officials and news of its contents reached Great Britain at about the same time as the petition itself. British advocates of a military response used Adams' letter to claim that the petition itself was insincere.

Penn and Lee provided a copy of the petition to colonial secretary Lord Dartmouth on August 21, followed with the original on September 1. They reported back on September 2: "we were told that as his Majesty did not receive it on the throne, no answer would be given." The King had already issued the Proclamation of Rebellion on August 23 in response to news of the Battle of Bunker Hill, declaring the American colonies to be in a state of rebellion and ordering "all Our officers… and all Our obedient and loyal subjects, to use their utmost endeavours to withstand and suppress such rebellion". The hostilities which Adams had foreseen undercut the petition, and the King had answered it before it even reached him.

Consequences

The King's refusal to consider the petition gave Adams and others the opportunity to push for independence, viewing the King as intransigent and uninterested in addressing the colonists' grievances. It polarized the issue in the minds of many colonists, who realized that the choice from that point forward was between complete independence and complete submission to British rule, a realization crystallized a few months later in Thomas Paine's widely read pamphlet Common Sense.

See also
 Founding Fathers of the United States
 Journals of the Continental Congress

References

External links 

1775 in international relations
1775 in the Thirteen Colonies
Collection of The National Archives (United Kingdom)
Ordinances of the Continental Congress
Diplomacy during the American Revolutionary War
Documents of the American Revolution
Petitions
1775 documents
George III of the United Kingdom